Marius Müller-Westernhagen (born 6 December 1948) is a German musician and actor. He has been a feature in German rock music since the mid-1970s. Müller-Westernhagen is known for his energetic public concerts, and his fans know his anthem-like songs by heart. Though written a few years earlier, his song "Freiheit" ("Freedom") is widely considered as an anthem of the German Reunification.

While keeping away from the merely fashionable, Müller-Westernhagen has nevertheless managed to reinvent himself every few years, and is popular with multiple generations of Germans. As a result of his singing which almost exclusively in German language in a country where pop and rock are primarily performed in English, Westernhagen originally seemed destined for obscurity, but has managed to use this to his advantage, defining himself as a durable alternative to the perceivably manufactured English-language hits of the US and UK.

Müller-Westernhagen has also acted in films and in radio.

Discography

 1975: Das erste Mal
 1976: Bittersüß
 1977: Ganz allein krieg ich's nicht hin
 1978: Mit Pfefferminz bin ich dein Prinz
 1980: Sekt oder Selters
 1981: Stinker
 1982: Das Herz eines Boxers
 1983: Geiler is' schon
 1984: Die Sonne so rot
 1985: Lass uns leben – 13 Balladen
 1986: Lausige Zeiten
 1987: Westernhagen
 1989: Halleluja
 1990: Live
 1992: Jaja
 1994: Affentheater
 1996: Keine Zeit (Soundtrack of the motion picture Keine Zeit)
 1998: Radio Maria
 2000: So weit ... – Best of
 2002: In den Wahnsinn
 2005: Nahaufnahme
 2009: Williamsburg
 2011: Hottentottenmusik (Live)
 2014: Alphatier
 2016: MTV Unplugged
 2019: Das Pfefferminz-Experiment
 2022: Das eine Leben

Selected filmography
 A Lost Life (1976), as Wenzel Sigorski
 Sladek oder Die schwarze Armee (1976, TV film), as Sladek
 Tatort:  (1976, TV series episode), as Horst Bremer
  (1977, TV film), as Theo Gromberg
 The Second Awakening of Christa Klages (1978), as Werner Wiedemann
  (1979, TV film), as Stefan Schröder
  (1980), as Theo Gromberg
  (1980, TV film), as Arno
  (1982), as Arnulf Kabe
  (1985), as Dorn
  (1987), as Martin Graves

References

External links

 
 
 

1948 births
Living people
Musicians from Düsseldorf
German male musicians
German male singers
German male film actors
20th-century German male actors
German male voice actors
Recipients of the Cross of the Order of Merit of the Federal Republic of Germany
Echo (music award) winners
German male television actors
Marius